Román Calzadilla was a  Cuban baseball catcher in the Cuban League. He played for 11 seasons from 1889 to 1902 for Matanzas, Progreso, Aguila de Oro, Habana and Fiesta. He was elected to the Cuban Baseball Hall of Fame in 1945.

References

External links
Seamheads.com

Cuban League players
Habana players
Matanzas players